Lowland single malts are single malt whiskies distilled in Scotland's lowlands. The region is home to distilleries such as: Annandale Distillery in Annan; Auchentoshan near Clydebank; Bladnoch in Galloway; Daftmill in Fife;   The Girvan Distilleries near Girvan;  and Glenkinchie distillery near Edinburgh.

Several new distilleries have begun to produce new-make spirit in recent years, including Kingsbarns distillery and InchDairnie distillery, both in Fife, and Lindores Abbey, at Ardgowan.

At least six other lowland single malts are still available, but are no longer distilled: Rosebank (currently undergoing revival), Kinclaith, St. Magdalene, Ladyburn, Inverleven, and Littlemill.

Lighter flavours

As a region, the Lowlands have been more strongly associated with grain whisky and blended whisky than malt whisky. Blended whisky often uses a high proportion of Lowland malt, as the less intense flavour profile means it does not dominate the other constituent whiskies.

In terms of Lowlands whisky flavour, the character of the malt often comes through strongly, with a soft body, according to another report. Traditionally the barley used has been unpeated, possibly because the Lowlands, East Lothian in particular, had a strong coal-mining industry. 

Another review states that most of the region's whiskies tend to be "lighter and grassier" without the "smoky" flavour produced by peat.

However, in recent years lowland distilleries such as Ailsa Bay and Annandale have become characterised by their use of peat, with a flavor profile more typical of Islay whiskey.

According to an August 2019 report, Auchentoshan is the region's only distillery still making whisky that is triple distilled which leads to "an edge of citrus flavour".

Legal status
The distinction between the Lowlands and the Highlands was originally drawn by the 1784 Wash Act. Highland distilleries were taxed based upon the size of their still; Lowland distilleries were taxed per gallon in the wash. This led to outrage from Lowland distillers over their comparably high duty rates.

Today the term Lowland is a "protected locality" for Scotch Whisky distilling under UK Government legislation. The modern Lowland–Highland line is drawn by the Scotch Whisky Regulations 2009 as follows:

This line is distinct from the geological Highland Fault line to the north. If the geological line were used, several Highland distilleries would become Lowland ones, including Loch Lomond and Fettercairn. According to Visit Scotland, the Lowlands region covers "much of the Central Belt and the South of Scotland including Edinburgh & The Lothians, Glasgow & The Clyde Valley, the Kingdom of Fife, Ayrshire, Dumfries & Galloway and the Scottish Borders". There were 18 distilleries in the region as of 2019, including some that opened quite recently, such as Lindores Abbey Distillery, Clydeside Distillery and Glasgow Distillery Company.

List of Lowland single malt distilleries

Active

 Ailsa Bay
 Annandale
 Auchentoshan
 Bladnoch
 Borders
 Clydeside
 Daftmill 
 Eden Mill
Glasgow
 Glenkinchie
 Kingsbarns
 Lindores Abbey
 Lochlea

In development
 Ardgowan
 Bonnington
 Burnbrae 
 The Clutha 
 Falkirk 
 Holyrood
 InchDairnie, Glenrothes
 Jackton
 Port of Leith 
 Rosebank

Closed or demolished
 Inverleven 
 Littlemill
 Bottlings of Littlemill are periodically released by the Loch Lomond Group, who took on ownership of the distillery shortly before its closure.
 Lochrin 
 St. Magdalene

References

Further reading

Scottish malt whisky
Scottish Lowlands